African Apocalypse is a 2020 documentary film directed and produced by Rob Lemkin. It features Femi Nylander and was produced by Geoff Arbourne and David Upshal. The film portrays a journey from Oxford, England to Niger on the trail of a colonial killer called Captain Paul Voulet. Voulet’s descent into barbarity mirrors that of Kurtz in Joseph Conrad's Heart of Darkness. Nylander discovers Voulet’s massacres happened at exactly the same time that Conrad wrote his book in 1899. In Niger, Nylander meets Nigerien communities along the route of Voulet’s trail who have lived with the legacy of his destruction.

It was broadcast by the BBC in May 2021 as an episode of the Arena documentary series.

Film festivals
The film competed in the Debate strand.

References

External links
 
 

2020 films
British documentary films
Hausa-language films
2020 documentary films
Nigerien documentary films
2020s English-language films
2020s British films